The Thai Canal, also known as Kra Canal or Kra Isthmus Canal, refers to proposals for a canal that would connect the Gulf of Thailand with the Andaman Sea across the Kra Isthmus in southern Thailand. Such a canal would significantly reduce travel times through heavily-navigated trade routes.

The canal would provide an alternative to transit through the Straits of Malacca and shorten transit for shipments of oil to Japan and China by 1,200 km. China refers to it as part of its 21st century maritime Silk Road. Proposals, of 2015, measure 102 kilometres long, 400 meters wide and 25 meters deep. Plans for a canal have been discussed and explored at various times. Cost, environmental concerns, and geopolitical concerns have been weighed against the potential economic and strategic benefits.

In February 2018, Thailand's Prime Minister Prayut Chan-o-cha declared that the canal was not a government priority. However, on 16 January 2020, the Thai House of Representatives agreed to set up a committee within 120 days to study the Thai Canal project.

History
A canal through the Kra Isthmus, which would shorten shipping times around Asia, was suggested as early as 1677. Thai King Narai asked the French engineer de Lamar to survey the possibility of building a waterway to connect Songkhla with Marid (now Myanmar), but the idea was discarded as impractical with the technology of that time.

In 1793, the idea resurfaced. Maha Sura Singhanat, the younger brother of King Chakri (Rama I), suggested it would make it easier to protect the west coast with military ships. In the early-19th century, the British East India Company became interested in a canal. After Burma became a British colony in 1863, an exploration was undertaken with Victoria Point (Kawthaung) opposite the Kra estuary as its southernmost point, again with negative result. In 1882, the constructor of the Suez canal, Ferdinand de Lesseps, visited the area, but the Thai king did not allow him to investigate in detail. In 1897, Thailand and the British empire agreed not to build a canal so that the regional dominance of the harbour of Singapore would be maintained.

In 1946, Thailand and the United Kingdom signed the Anglo-Thai Peace Treaty, ending the state of war between the two countries during the Second World War. Out of the many concessions made in the treaty, one of the articles forbid the Thais from digging a canal across the Kra isthmus without British government permission.

As there was no progress on a canal, the construction of a road for cargo across the isthmus was started in 1993. Such a large highway was built but as where the harbours would go was not set Highway 44 does not yet end at the sea. Its sets of lanes are 150 m apart to leave space for railway and a pipeline.

Geography

Several canal routes have been proposed: The original Kra Canal was envisioned as cutting through the Kra Isthmus between Ranong and Chumphon, the narrowest part of the South, a distance of about 50 kilometres. Other routes proposed include a route in southern Thailand connecting Bandon Bay near Surat Thani with Phang Nga Province. Another is across Nakhon Si Thammarat Province and Trang Province. The seemingly preferred version of the Kra Canal project—Route 9A—would dig through Krabi, Trang, Phattalung, Nakhon Si Thammarat and Songkhla, a distance of 128 kilometres. Variation Route 5A would have ships enter the canal at Pak Bara in Satun Province. Another route would see ships entering a 135 km long canal at Sikao in Trang.

Rationale
The idea of a Kra Canal has been proposed in modern times since the 1930s, but has never materialized due to high cost and environmental repercussions.

It is used by many oil tankers, bulk carriers and container ships. It is estimated that some 80% of Japan's and South Korea's oil and natural gas supplies pass through it. The strait, the world's busiest shipping route, saw a record 84,000 vessels sail through it in 2016. Its yearly capacity is 120,000 vessels. The Maritime Institute of Malaysia forecasts that by 2025, about 140,000 vessels and freighters will seek to transit the strait. A canal would reduce shipping times between the South China Sea and the Andaman Sea two or three days and reduce distance travelled by at least 1,200 kilometres compared with the strait. Bunker fuel savings for a 100,000 dwt (deadweight) oil tanker could be as much as US$350,000 per trip.

In early 2015, calls for yet another feasibility study of the canal were put forward, a leading proponent being the Thai-Chinese Culture and Economic Association of Thailand (TCCEAT). Supporters of the canal believe that it would end Thailand's economic slump and make it a "global shipping and economic hub, rivalling the Panama Canal". On 15 May 2015, a memorandum of understanding was signed by the China-Thailand Kra Infrastructure Investment and Development company (中泰克拉基础设施投资开发有限公司) in Guangzhou to advance the project. On 19 May 2015 the Thai government denied reports that an agreement had been signed with China to construct the canal. The canal would take an estimated ten years to complete at a cost of US$28 billion.

In 2005, an internal report prepared for U.S. Secretary of Defense Donald Rumsfeld was leaked to The Washington Times, spelling out China's strategy of underwriting construction of the canal across the Kra Isthmus, with Chinese port facilities and refineries, as part of its "string of pearls" strategy of forward bases and energy security. The Chinese plan called for construction over ten years employing roughly 30,000 workers at a cost of between US$20–25 billion.

Canal opponents have raised several objections to the construction of a canal: 
 A canal will divide the country physically and pose a security risk. It is feared that a canal would separate the four southernmost provinces from the rest of Thailand and allow secessionist movements to further develop; 
 Demand for transit will not meet expectations.
 The excavated soil will need to be dealt with.
 Environmental concerns.

Potential regional impact 
The canal would compete directly with ports in the Strait of Malacca area, including Port Klang, Tanjung Pelepas, and Singapore. According to a May 2002 report in the Malaysian Business Times, any effect on Malaysia would not be felt for 15 years after the completion of the canal. Singapore has expressed concerns about an adverse impact on its economy from the proposed canal. One report estimated that Singapore might lose 30% of its shipping trade as a result of the canal.

As of 2011, an estimated 15.1 million barrels of oil per day pass through the Strait of Malacca, the existing route. Excluding port fees and tolls, it costs about US$0.00106 per ton-mile to operate a 265,000 DWT double-hulled tanker in 1995 dollars.

Impact on India
According to US and Indian analysts, a Thai Canal could potentially improve China's naval presence and opportunity in the Indian Ocean. From a military viewpoint, they speculate that a Thai Canal will be an important step for China to strengthen what they call China's "String of Pearls", a series of Chinese alliances and naval bases, including deepwater seaports in Sri Lanka and Pakistan. The analysts fear that a Thai Canal, in combination with the String of Pearls, will encircle India militarily in the ongoing China-India conflict.

See also 
 Nicaragua Canal
 Sulawesi Canal, a proposed canal project located on the island of Sulawesi, Indonesia
 Thai-Burma Railway, a railroad bypass for the Malay peninsula
 ECRL, a similar project linking both coasts of Peninsular Malaysia
 String of Pearls, Chinese geopolitical goal used for supporting the project.

Notes

References

General references

External links
 Thai Canal project (Thai Language Site)
 
 Thai Canal A resource page featuring historical archives of news articles, maps, and other reports.

Kra Isthmus
Abandoned canal projects
Canals in Thailand
Proposed transport infrastructure in Thailand
Proposed canals